Peter Hobbs (born 1973) is a British novelist.

He grew up in Cornwall and North Yorkshire and was educated at New College, Oxford. He began writing during a prolonged illness that cut short a potential diplomatic career.

He is the author of two novels: The Short Day Dying (2005) and In the Orchard, the Swallows (2012), and of I Could Ride All Day in my Cool Blue Train (2006), a book of short stories. He is also published in New Writing 13, an annual anthology of new work, and 'Zembla'. He is currently a writer-in-residence for the charity First Story, where he inspires young writers to write short stories and poems which are published in a yearly anthology.

The Short Day Dying was short listed for the 2005 Whitbread First Book Award (known now as the Costa Book Awards), the 2005 John Llewellyn Rhys Prize, the 2007 International Dublin Literary Award and won a 2006 Betty Trask Award.

External links
Interview
Doodled Books Ltd

Alumni of New College, Oxford
Fellows of the Royal Society of Literature
1973 births
Living people